Smuggler's Run 2: Hostile Territory or simply Smuggler's Run 2 is a video game released for the PlayStation 2 in 2001. It is a sequel to the 2000 game Smuggler's Run. Like the first game the player is a smuggler trying to deliver illegal cargo to destinations within 3 large maps in the game using several different types of vehicles to make deliveries in a given amount of time. A GameCube version was released in 2002 titled Smuggler's Run: Warzones.

The game was originally supposed to take place in Afghanistan but following the attacks on the World Trade Center and the subsequent invasion of Afghanistan, the developers changed the Afghanistan levels to the deserts of Georgia/Russia instead.

As in the first one, the police can drive the same cars but with much greater max speeds, the ability to go faster, slower and turn in midair to land on the player off jumps, extreme acceleration, and they can easily outnumber the player. Along with very inflexible time limits, this often leaves no room for mistakes.

Gameplay

Similar to the original game, the overall objective in most missions is to deliver illegal contraband from a pick-up to a drop-off spot in a given amount of time. The player would also have to avoid the local army and border patrol during these missions. Now, players also have to follow vehicles without being seen, destroy enemy vehicles, and evade police after all other objectives are finished. The player is given a number of vehicles to choose from.

Plot

The game takes place in three locations with the player working for a small smuggling company named Exotic Imports (EI or EXO for short). The story focuses on the activities and objectives given by The Colonel to EI. It starts in Russia, where the player finds out who they are working for and the basics of the game. Then, after being told to leave immediately from the area by Shodi (The main client) to Vietnam, Exotic Imports then learns of the CIA being involved after the Russians track 2 kg of Weapons Grade Plutonium. This takes you back to Russia, where Frank (Your Boss) asks the Colonel what is happening with the "nukes" and involvement from the CIA. Frank, only caring for money, agrees to continue smuggling nuclear devices. However, the rest of EI decide not to, and try to stop a missile which would cause WWIII. This reveals the Colonel's intentions, and Frank escapes with all the passwords, showing his plans. EI stop Frank, and then it shows the player flying off in a helicopter with a cheque for $100,501,000.

Reception

Both Hostile Territory and Warzones received "generally favorable reviews" according to the review aggregation website Metacritic. Jim Preston of Next Generation called the former "A small improvement over the original that also smartly retains all the fun." Smuggler's Run: Warzones was a runner-up for GameSpots annual "Best Driving Game on GameCube" award, which went to NASCAR: Dirt to Daytona.

References

External links

2001 video games
GameCube games
PlayStation 2 games
Racing video games
Rockstar Games games
Video game sequels
Take-Two Interactive games
Video games developed in the United States
Multiplayer and single-player video games
Video games written by Dan Houser
Video games produced by Dan Houser